This is a list of newspapers and news agencies in Tajikistan.

Newspapers
Asia Plus  
Avicenna – in Tajik and Russian (Dushanbe)
DigestPress – in Russian (Dushanbe)
Farazh  – Tajik (Dushanbe)  
Golos Tajikistana – published weekly in Russian by the Communist Party
Jumhuriyat – government-owned, published tri-weekly in Tajik (Dushanbe) 
Khalq Ovozi – government-owned, published tri-weekly in Uzbek
The Khujand Plov (Khujand) – English-language, caters to foreigners, specializes in satirical content
Minbar-i Khalq – published by the People's Democratic Party
Najot – published weekly by the Islamic Rebirth Party
Narodnaya Gazeta – government-owned, published tri-weekly in Russian
Neru-i Sukhan – privately owned, published weekly
Nido-i Ranjbar – published weekly in Tajik by the Communist Party
Sadoi mardum – a thrice-weekly newspaper published in Tajikistan; one of the most widely circulated papers in the country; in Tajik 
Tojikiston – privately owned, published weekly in Tajik

News agencies
Asia-Plus – private, English-language agency
Avesta – private, English-language
Khovar – state-run
Varorud – private

See also
List of newspapers
List of journalists killed in Tajikistan

References

Tajikistan
 
Newspapers